Sten Gustaf Fredrik Troil Ramel (9 December 1872 – 30 October 1947) was a Swedish baron, governor, diplomat and officer. He was the Governor of Malmöhus County from 1925 to 1938.

Biography
He was the son of Hans Fredrik Ramel (1845–1892) and Carolina Alexandrina von Troil (1851–1917).

Ramel studied law in Lund and took his graduation in 1890 and became law notary in 1897. Ramel started his diplomatic career first as an attaché in the foreign ministry in 1895. The same year he worked at the generalconsulate in Rome, to become second secretary at the foreign ministry in 1897, first secretary in 1900 and cabinet secretary in 1908 to 1913. As cabinet secretary Ramel handled feuds with Norway, he has been described as pro-German.

As Secretary of State he worked to implement the Oslo convention.

References

1872 births
1947 deaths
Swedish jurists
Barons of Sweden
Politicians from Malmö
Governors of Malmöhus County
Swedish Ministers for Foreign Affairs
Ambassadors of Sweden to Norway
Ambassadors of Sweden to Germany
Commanders Grand Cross of the Order of the Polar Star